Marcial "Mars" Ravelo (October 9, 1916 – September 12, 1988) was a Filipino comic book cartoonist and graphic novelist who created Darna, Dyesebel, Captain Barbell, Lastikman, Bondying, Varga, Wanted: Perfect Mother, Hiwaga, Maruja, Mariposa, Roberta, Rita, Buhay Pilipino, Jack and Jill, Flash Bomba, Tiny Tony, and Dragonna among others.

Early life
Mars Ravelo was born on October 9, 1916, when America still occupied the Philippines.

Career
Ravelo started out as a cartoonist, then as a writer, and later on as editor-in-chief for two publications houses and for several film companies. He later established his own company, RAR.

Ravelo created the characters of Darna the super heroine, Dyesebel the love-lorn mermaid, and Captain Barbel the super hero, Facifica Falayfay, and the duo of Jack & Jill. He also created the drama about a young orphaned girl named Roberta for Sampaguita Pictures. Ravelo wrote the movie adaptation of Alicia Vergel's Basahang Ginto. Ravelo is known to be the "King of Philippine Komiks."

Death
Mars Ravelo died on September 12, 1988, due to heart attack.

List of Mars Ravelo's comic book characters
Bondying
Buhay Pilipino
Captain Barbell
Darna
Dragonna
Flash Bomba
Hiwaga
Jack and Jill
Kapitan Boom
Lastikman
Mariposa
Maruja
Rita
Roberta
Tiny Tony
Varga
Wanted: Perfect Mother

Published works (in alphabetical order)

Legacy

In popular culture
The life story of Mars Ravelo was featured in the anthology series Magpakailanman on May 26, 2005, actor Dennis Trillo portrayed Ravelo.

References

External links
 Mars Ravelo's Darna website
 
 Mars Ravelo at Lambiek's Comiclopedia
 Mars Ravelo at Comic Vine

1916 births
1988 deaths
People from Tanza, Cavite
Filipino comics artists
Filipino comics writers
Artists from Cavite
Writers from Cavite
Darna